The Louisiana State University System is a system of public colleges and universities in Louisiana.  It is budgetarily the largest public university system in the state.

William F. Tate IV is president of the LSU system, and also serves as chancellor of its flagship campus and namesake, Louisiana State University. Administrative headquarters are located in the University Administration Building on the property of Louisiana State University in Baton Rouge. The system had an endowment of $955.5 million in fiscal year 2020.

Current Louisiana State University entities

Institutions
Louisiana State University and Agricultural and Mechanical College (main campus in Baton Rouge; opened in 1860)
Louisiana State University Agricultural Center - Baton Rouge (established 1972)
Louisiana State University of Alexandria (opened 1960)
Louisiana State University at Eunice (opened 1967)
Louisiana State University Shreveport (opened 1967)
LSU Health Sciences Center New Orleans (established in 1931)
LSU Health Sciences Center Shreveport (classes began 1969)
Paul M. Hebert Law Center - Baton Rouge (became separate institution in 1977)
Pennington Biomedical Research Center - Baton Rouge

LSU Health Care Services Division
Lallie Kemp Regional Medical Center, Independence.

Cooperative Extension Service
The LSU System has a presence in all 64 Louisiana parishes through its cooperative extension service. This service assists farmers, gardeners, and other businesses in dealing with some of Louisiana's unique environmental challenges.

LSU Online
The Louisiana State University system offers online degree programs through LSU Online. Online degrees are conferred from multiple campus institutions.

See also

 List of colleges and universities in Louisiana
 List of hospitals in Louisiana

References

External links
 Official website

 
 
Public university systems in the United States